Riverdale High School may refer to:

Schools
Riverdale High School, Riverdale, California, U.S.
Riverdale High School (Fort Myers, Florida), U.S.
Riverdale High School (Riverdale, Georgia), U.S.
Riverdale High School (Port Byron, Illinois), U.S.
Riverdale High School (Jefferson Parish, Louisiana), U.S.
Riverdale High School (Hancock County, Ohio), U.S.
Riverdale High School (Portland, Oregon), U.S.
Riverdale High School (Murfreesboro, Tennessee), U.S.
Riverdale High School (Muscoda, Wisconsin), U.S.
Riverdale High School (Quebec), Canada

Fictional entities
Riverdale High School (Archie Comics), the fictional school in Archie Comics

See also
Riverdale Collegiate Institute, a high school in Toronto, Ontario, Canada